The Jakarta Flood Canal refers to two canals that divert floods from rivers around Jakarta instead of going through the city. This first flood control channel was designed by Hendrik van Breen, an engineer working for the Dutch East Indian Department van Burgelijke Openbare Werken (BOW—lit. Department of Public Civil Works, currently the Ministry of Public Works and People's Housing), after a big flood hit the city on 13 February 1918.

West and East Flood Canal
With help of Netherlands Engineering Consultants, the "Master Plan for Drainage and Flood Control of Jakarta" was published in December 1973. According to this plan, flood control of Jakarta would revolve around two canals encircling the city.

The canals divert the water flowing from the south around the city and into the sea. These canals are known as West Flood Canal (Indonesian: Banjir Kanal Barat) and East Flood Canal (Indonesian: Banjir Kanal Timur). Other measures to control floods in Jakarta include reservoirs and pumps in areas below sea level. This system built in 1983.

West Flood Canal
The West Flood Canal marked the southern boundary of the Menteng residential area. The flood canal was included in the 1918 Batavia city plan and constructed in 1919. It runs from the floodgate in Manggarai, via Pasar Rumput, Dukuh Atas, Karet Kubur, Tanah Abang, Tomang, Grogol, and Pademangan to the sea at Muara Angke. Another floodgate is located in Karet. A still existing bronze plaque on the Manggarai floodgate honours Van Breen and commemorates the canal's first use in diverting the flood of 1919.

In the 1973 master plan, a system of canals was planned to cut to the flow of water in West Jakarta. This was a continuation of Van Breen's canal and would later be known as the West Flood Canal. The construction was delayed by problems in clearing the heavily populated area. After a flood in January 1979, the central government and the provincial government of Jakarta revised the West Flood Canal plan by the construction of the Cengkareng drainage system.

East Flood Canal
The 23.6 km East Flood Canal flows from East Jakarta to North Jakarta. The width of the canal varies from 100 to 300 m. Construction began on 22 June 2002, but has been delayed due to problems in clearing the area. The East Flood Canal is planned to divert the Ciliwung River, Cipinang River, Sunter River, Buaran River, Jati Kramat River, and Cakung River.

During the 2013 Jakarta Flood, the East Flood Canal was still not connected to the Ciliwung River. The government plans to connect the two via a tunnel.

See also 
Flooding in Jakarta
Giant Sea Wall Jakarta

References

External links 
  Menanti Kendali Banjir Selesai, Kompas Newspaper
  Gatra Online Magazine

Flood control in Indonesia
Flood control projects
Water in Jakarta
Buildings and structures in Jakarta